The Ministry of Internally Displaced Persons from the Occupied Territories, Health, Labour and Social Affairs of Georgia (sakartvelos okupirebuli teritoriebidan idzulebit gadaadgilebul pirta, shromis, janmrtelobisa da sotsialuri datsvis saministro) is a governmental agency within the Cabinet of Georgia in charge of regulating the healthcare system, labor and IDP issues, and social security system in Georgia. From June 2019 to December 2021, the ministry was headed by Ekaterine Tikaradze.

Structure
The ministry is headed by a minister appointed by the Prime Minister of Georgia. One first deputy minister and three deputies report directly to the minister. The ministry is made up from 16 departments and agencies. Main functions of the ministry are ensuring provision of good medical and public health services to the population; regulation of medical and pharmaceutical activity in the country; management of state pensions and social security; and protection of rights of children.
The ministry has all the power to regulate all medical activities throughout the country through its chapters. The State United Social Insurance Fund and the Ministry of Finance of Georgia are the main sources of funding for the Ministry of Health, Labor and Social Affairs.
In recent years, the ministry carried out an expansion of hospitals network by planned completion of 46 new hospitals by the end of 2011.

See also
Cabinet of Georgia
National Center for Disease Control and Public Health (Georgia (country))

References

Health, Labour and Social Affairs
Georgia
Georgia
Georgia